Gur-i Sabz (also Romanized as Gūr-i Sabz, with Persian gūr 'grave, tomb,' and sabz 'green,' and the possessive/adjectival enclitic/connecting suffix [-e], meaning "the Green Grave") is a village in Miyankuh-e Gharbi Rural District, in the Central District of Pol-e Dokhtar County, Lorestan Province, Iran. At the 2006 census, its population was 37, in 7 families.

References 

Towns and villages in Pol-e Dokhtar County